is a 1989 role-playing game developed by Nihon Falcom. It is the sixth game in the Dragon Slayer series and the first in The Legend of Heroes franchise.

It was originally released in 1989 for the NEC PC-8801. Within the next few years it would also be ported to the NEC PC-9801, MSX 2, PC Engine CD-ROM/TurboGrafx-CD, Sharp X68000, Sega Mega Drive, and Super Famicom. A Dragon Slayer: The Legend of Heroes Barcode Battler card set was also released by Epoch Co. in 1992. The PC Engine version was released in the United States for the TurboGrafx-CD and was the only game in the series released in the US until The Legend of Heroes: A Tear of Vermillion, the PlayStation Portable remake.

In 1995, a version of the game was broadcast exclusively for Japanese markets via the Super Famicom's Satellaview subunit under the name BS Dragon Slayer Eiyu Densetsu. In 1998, a remake of The Legend of Heroes was bundled with a remake of Dragon Slayer: The Legend of Heroes II and was released for both the PlayStation and Sega Saturn.

Reception
The PC Engine version was rated 25.24 out of 30 by PC Engine Fan magazine. Famitsu scored the PC Engine CD-ROM version 29 out of 40 in 1991. They later scored the Super Famicom version 29 out of 40 in 1992, and the Sega Mega Drive version 23 out of 40 in 1994.

In its January 1993 issue, Electronic Games magazine's Electronic Gaming Awards nominated the TurboGrafx-CD version for the 1992 Multimedia Game of the Year award. They wrote it "demonstrates how far multimedia has come" since the same design team's Ys I & II and that this "mammoth quest is meticulously detailed and incorporates highly involved game play".

Notes

References

External links
 Dragon Slayer: Legend of Heroes GUIDE (TurboGrafx-CD) and Dragon Slayer: Legend of Heroes PREVIEW at TurboPlay Magazine Archives

Role-playing video games
Dragon Slayer (series)
FM Towns games
MSX2 games
NEC PC-8801 games
NEC PC-9801 games
PlayStation (console) games
TurboGrafx-CD games
X68000 games
Sega Genesis games
Sega Saturn games
Satellaview games
Super Nintendo Entertainment System games
Windows games
Video games developed in Japan
Virtual Console games
The Legend of Heroes
1989 video games
Single-player video games
Hudson Soft games
Nihon Falcom games